Thonburi United Football Club (Thai สโมสรฟุตบอลธนบุรี ยูไนเต็ด), is a Thai football club under the stewardship of Thonburi University based in Bangkok, Thailand. The club is currently playing in the Thai League 3 Bangkok metropolitan region.

History
In 2016, the club has established and competed in Thailand Amateur League Bangkok Metropolitan region, used Thonburi University Stadium as ground. They competed in the amateur league to 2017 and 2018 season continuously.

In 2019, the club has promoted to Thai League 4 or also known as Omsin League. The club made the new history by advanced to the round of 16 in Thai League Cup, they beat Samut Prakan City from Thai League 1 in the round of 32, before defeated to PT Prachuap in the round of 16. The club could advanced to 2019 Thai League 4 Champions League.

Crest history

Stadium and locations

Season by season record

P = Played
W = Games won
D = Games drawn
L = Games lost
F = Goals for
A = Goals against
Pts = Points
Pos = Final position

QR1 = First Qualifying Round
QR2 = Second Qualifying Round
R1 = Round 1
R2 = Round 2
R3 = Round 3
R4 = Round 4

R5 = Round 5
R6 = Round 6
QF = Quarter-finals
SF = Semi-finals
RU = Runners-up
W = Winners

References

External links
 Thai League official website
 Club's official Facebook page
 Club's info from Thai League official website

Association football clubs established in 2016
Football clubs in Thailand
2016 establishments in Thailand
University and college association football clubs